Radu Șerban (? – 23 March 1620) was a Wallachian nobleman who reigned as the principality's voivode during two periods from 1602 to 1610 and during 1611. A supposed descendant of Neagoe Basarab, he attained high office during the reign of Michael the Brave. After ascending the throne, he continued the policy of independence of Wallachia first put forth by Michael the Brave. Having struggled with great difficulties inside and outside the country, he managed to cope successfully during a reign lasting almost ten years. He has been noted for his particular political skill and military prowess, proving to be one of the more noteworthy princes of Wallachia.

Notes

1620 deaths
Rulers of Wallachia
Year of birth unknown
People of the Long Turkish War
Craiovești